NGC 6503 is a field dwarf spiral galaxy located at the edge of a region of space called the Local Void. The dwarf galaxy spans 30,000 light-years and lies approximately 17 million light-years away in the constellation of Draco (the Dragon). The spiral galaxy is especially colorful where bright red regions of gas can be seen scattered through its spiral arms. Bright blue regions contain stars that are forming. Dark brown dust areas are in the galaxy's arms and center.

NGC 6503 has one known satellite galaxy, known as KK 242. With a stellar mass of about 3 million solar masses, KK 242 is on the border between a dwarf irregular galaxy (dIrr) and a dwarf spheroidal galaxy (dSph).

Gallery

References

External links 

 At the Edge of the Abyss – ESA/Hubble Picture of the week.

Draco (constellation)
Dwarf spiral galaxies
Field galaxies
6503